Domhnall Ua Dubhthaigh, Archbishop of Connacht, died 1136.

The post of Archbishop of Connacht was a precursor to that of Archbishop of Tuam.

His death is noted in the Annals of the Four Masters as follows:

Domhnall Ua Dubhthaigh, Archbishop of Connaught, and successor of Ciaran, head of the wisdom and hospitality of the province, died after mass and celebration at Cluain-fearta-Brenainn.

The Annals of Loch Cé have his obit sub anno 1137, describing him as "Domhnall Ua Dubhthaigh, bishop of Elphin, and comarb of Ciaran of Cluain-mic-Nois."

References

 http://www.irishtimes.com/ancestor/surname/index.cfm?fuseaction=History&Surname=duffy&UserID=
 http://www.ucc.ie/celt/online/T100005B/text025.html
 http://www.ucc.ie/celt/online/T100013/text002.html
 Episcopal Hierarchy in Connacht and Tairdelbach Ua Conchobair, Colman Etchingham, Journal of the Galway Archaeological and Historical Society, vol. 52, 2000, pp. 13–29.
 Irish Kings and High Kings, Francis John Byrne (1971); 3rd revised edition, Dublin: Four Courts Press, 2001. 
 A very puzzling Irish Missal, John A. Claffey, Journal of the Galway Archaeological and Historical Society, Volume 55, 2003, pp. 1–12.
 The Inauguration site of Tairrdelbach Ua Conchobair, Elizabeth FitzPatrick, in Assembly Places and Practices in Medieval Europe, ed. Aliki Pantos and Sara Temple, Four Courts Press, Dublin, 2004. .

People from County Roscommon
People from County Galway
Medieval Gaels from Ireland
12th-century Roman Catholic archbishops in Ireland